Flinders Street  is a main street in the city centre of Adelaide, South Australia. It runs from the northern end of Victoria Square to East Terrace, Adelaide.

History
The street is named after the navigator and cartographer Captain Matthew Flinders.

On 22 November 1878 the East Adelaide Model School, later Flinders Street Public School or Flinders Street Model School, was opened in large bluestone buildings designed by E. J. Woods. A primary school occupied the premises until 1969, when the Flinders Street Adult Education Centre was established there. In 1978 it became the Flinders St School of Music, a campus of TAFE.

Many churches were built on Flinders Street in the 1860s and 1870s, and several survive today.

In August 2022, the City of Adelaide renamed a laneway off Flinders Street, behind Adelaide Town Hall, Paul Kelly Lane. Previously named Pilgrim Lane after the adjacent church, the lane is now called Paul Kelly Lane. It is the fourth such renaming after musicians associated with the city, the others being Sia Furler, No Fixed Address, and Cold Chisel.

Historic buildings

Churches
 churches on Flinders Street include:
Bethlehem Lutheran Church, at no. 170, on the corner of Sudholz Place
Flinders Street Baptist Church, at no. 65; includes manse, now Baptist Church Offices, and Mead Hall; all heritage-listed.
Pilgrim Uniting Church, at no. 12

Other historic buildings
Flinders Hall, originally built as school accommodation for St Paul's Church of England, sold to Hamilton Laboratories in the 1950s
Observatory House, at no. 84-86, originally built for a scientific instrument-making business run by Otto Boettger, who emigrated to South Australia from Germany in 1877 
Office of Multi-Cultural Affairs, originally the manse of the Stow Memorial Church (now Pilgrim), used as a sanitarium 1901–1911. before being sold to the state government
St Paul's Church, built 1972, known as a High Anglican church, whose congregation included many prominent families; converted into a nightclub during the 1980s; now St Paul's Creative Centre, accommodating people working in the arts and creative industries

Junction list

See also

Footnotes

References

Streets in Adelaide